Coal-fired pizza is a pizza style in the United States. New York-style pizza and New Haven-style pizza are often cooked in coal-fired pizza ovens. A coal-fired oven can reach  and cooks a pie in two to five minutes.

Pizzerias outside of the Northeastern United States that feature coal-fired ovens are uncommon enough to be noted in travel guides: for instance, Black Sheep Pizza with the first coal-fired oven in Minneapolis, or URBN in San Diego. As of 2007, coal-fired ovens were quite uncommon in the Western United States with only five others west of the Mississippi: four in an Arizona chain and one more in Las Vegas.

The growing popularity of coal-fired pizza in the 2010s was identified as a major market for anthracite coal suppliers, most of whom are in Pennsylvania's Coal Region and generally see a declining market due to demand for alternate industrial and home heating fuel sources.

Health concerns
Concerns have been raised about particulates, sulfur dioxide and CO2 emissions from coal-fired pizza ovens.

References

Further reading

Coal
Cooking techniques
Pizza in New York City
Pizza in the United States